This is a list of species in the agaric genus Leucocoprinus.

Species 
As of October 2022, Species Fungorum accepted 84 species of Leucocoprinus. Whilst Mycobank includes an additional 13 species not in Species Fungorum (marked here with MB), many of which are newly described species. The majority of these species are not well known and not often recorded. Some may be described based on a single recorded observation and a decades' old deposited specimen and may be subject to future reclassification. New species are regularly being described from remote tropical locations with only a small number of the species here being commonly observed in temperate regions. Additionally some of these species may be synonyms that haven't been reclassified yet or remain as currently recognised species in error. For instance Leucocoprinus flos-sulphuris is a synonym for L. birnbaumii and Leucocoprinus zeyheri was reclassified as Macrolepiota zeyheri whilst newly described species such as L. fluminensis and L. rhodolepis have yet to be added to the list of accepted species.  
 Leucocoprinus acer Raithelh. (1988)
 Leucocoprinus acutoumbonatus T.K.A.Kumar & Manim. (2009)
 Leucocoprinus armeniacoflavus E.Ludw. (2012)
 Leucocoprinus antillarum  Justo, Bizzi & Angelini (2021) MB
 Leucocoprinus aureofloccosus (Henn.) Bon (1981)
 Leucocoprinus austrofragilis Aberdeen (1992)
 Leucocoprinus bakeri (Dennis) Singer (1982)
 Leucocoprinus beelianus Heinem. (1977)
 Leucocoprinus biornatus (Berk. & Broome) Locq. (1945)
 Leucocoprinus birnbaumii (Corda) Singer (1962)
 Leucocoprinus bonianus (Pat.) Zhu L.Yang (2000)
 Leucocoprinus brebissonii (Godey) Locq. (1943)
 Leucocoprinus breviramus H.V.Sm. & N.S.Weber (1982)
 Leucocoprinus brunneoluteus Capelari & Gimenes (2004)
 Leucocoprinus brunneosporus  B.E.Lechner & J.M.Suarez (2021) MB
 Leucocoprinus brunneotegulis Dähncke, Contu & Vizzini (2011)
 Leucocoprinus brunnescens (Peck) Pegler (1983)
 Leucocoprinus bulbipes (Mont.) Raithelh. (1987)
 Leucocoprinus canariensis P.Mohr & Dähncke (2004)
 Leucocoprinus castroi Blanco-Dios (2003)
 Leucocoprinus cepistipes (Sowerby) Pat. (1889)
 Leucocoprinus chryseus Wichanský (1963)
 Leucocoprinus citrinellus (Speg.) Raithelh. (1987)
 Leucocoprinus cretaceus (Bull.) Locq. (1945)
 Leucocoprinus cristatulus (Rick) Raithelh. (1987)
 Leucocoprinus cygneus (J.E.Lange) Bon (1978)
 Leucocoprinus delicatulus T.K.A.Kumar & Manim. (2009)
 Leucocoprinus discoideus (Beeli) Heinem. (1977)
 Leucocoprinus domingensis Justo, Bizzi, Angelini & Vizzini (2020) MB
 Leucocoprinus emilei E.Ludw. (2012) MB
 Leucocoprinus elaeidis (Beeli) Heinem. (1977)
 Leucocoprinus fibrillosus Raithelh. (1988)
 Leucocoprinus flavescens (Morgan) H.V.Sm. (1981)
 Leucocoprinus flavipes Pat. & Gaillard (1888) MB
 Leucocoprinus flavus (Beeli) Heinem. (1977)
 Leucocoprinus flos-sulphuris (Schnizl.) Cejp (1948)
 Leucocoprinus fragilissimus (Ravenel ex Berk. & M.A.Curtis) Pat. (1900)
 Leucocoprinus fuligineopunctatus  Justo, Bizzi & Angelini (2021) MB
 Leucocoprinus fuscatus Pegler (1977)
 Leucocoprinus gandour Har. & Pat. (1909)
 Leucocoprinus griseofloccosus Lagardère & Eyssart. (2018)
 Leucocoprinus heinemannii Migl. (1987)
 Leucocoprinus heterosporus Locq. (1945) MB
 Leucocoprinus holospilotus (Berk. & Broome) D.A.Reid (1990)
 Leucocoprinus ianthinus (Sacc.) P.Mohr (1994)
 Leucocoprinus imerinensis Bouriquet (1942)
 Leucocoprinus inflatus Raithelh. (1987)
 Leucocoprinus lanzonii Bon, Migl. & Brunori (1989)
 Leucocoprinus longistriatus (Peck) H.V.Sm. & N.S.Weber (1982)
 Leucocoprinus madecassensis R.Heim (1977)
 Leucocoprinus magnicystidiosus H.V.Sm. & N.S.Weber (1982)
 Leucocoprinus magnusianus (Henn.) Singer (1951)
 Leucocoprinus martinicensis Blanco-Dios (2020)
 Leucocoprinus maublancii Locq. (1945)
 Leucocoprinus mauritianus (Henn.) P.Mohr (2004)
 Leucocoprinus medioflavus (Boud.) Bon (1976)
 Leucocoprinus melanoloma (Singer) Singer (1938)
 Leucocoprinus microlepis Justo, Bizzi & Angelini (2021) MB
 Leucocoprinus micropholis (Berk. & Broome) Locq. (1951) MB
 Leucocoprinus minimus (Berk.) Pegler (1981)
 Leucocoprinus minutulus Singer (1941)
 Leucocoprinus munnarensis T.K.A.Kumar & Manim. (2009)
 Leucocoprinus muticolor Aberdeen (1992)
 Leucocoprinus nanianae Bouriquet (1946)
 Leucocoprinus nigricans Jezek (1973)
 Leucocoprinus noctiphilus (Ellis) Heinem. (1977)
 Leucocoprinus ovatus Raithelh. (2004)
 Leucocoprinus parvipileus Justo, Bizzi, Angelini & Vizzini (2020) MB
 Leucocoprinus pepinosporus Heinem. (1977)
 Leucocoprinus phaeopus (Rick) Raithelh. (1987)
 Leucocoprinus proletarius (Rick) Raithelh. (1987)
 Leucocoprinus pusillus T.K.A.Kumar & Manim. (2009)
 Leucocoprinus revolutus (Rick) Raithelh. (1987)
 Leucocoprinus rhodolepis Ferretti-Cisn. & Wartchow (2022) MB
 Leucocoprinus rivulosus Raithelh. (1987)
 Leucocoprinus rubrosquamosus (Rick) Raithelh. (1991)
 Leucocoprinus russoceps (Berk. & Broome) Raithelh. (1987)
 Leucocoprinus scissus Justo, Bizzi & Angelini (2021) MB
 Leucocoprinus squamulosus (Mont.) Pegler (1983)
 Leucocoprinus straminellus (Bagl.) Narducci & Caroti (1995)
 Leucocoprinus subglobisporus Hongo (1985)
 Leucocoprinus submontagnei Heinem. (1977)
 Leucocoprinus tanetensis Bouriquet (1946)
 Leucocoprinus tenellus (Boud.) Locq. (1943)
 Leucocoprinus tephrolepis Justo, Bizzi, Angelini & Vizzini (2020) MB
 Leucocoprinus thoenii Heinem. (1977)
 Leucocoprinus tricolor H.V.Sm. (1981)
 Leucocoprinus tropicus Natarajan & Manjula (1982)
 Leucocoprinus truncatus (A.Pearson) E.Ludw. & P.Mohr (2012)
 Leucocoprinus velutipes Heinem. (1977)
 Leucocoprinus venezuelanus Dennis (1961)
 Leucocoprinus violaceus Heinem. (1977)
 Leucocoprinus viridiflavoides (B.P.Akers & Angels) E.Ludw. (2012)
 Leucocoprinus viridiflavus (Petch) E.Ludw. (2012)
 Leucocoprinus wynneae (Berk. & Broome) Locq. (1943)
 Leucocoprinus zeyheri (Berk.) Singer (1943)
 Leucocoprinus zeylanicus (Berk.) Boedijn (1940)

References 

L
Leucocoprinus  species, List of